Tanea is a genus of sea snails, marine gastropod molluscs in the subfamily Naticinae ( of the family Naticidae, the moon snails or necklace shells.

Species
Species within the genus Tanea include:
 Tanea albifasciata (X. Liu, 1977)
 Tanea aerolata (Récluz, 1844)
 † Tanea consortis (Finlay, 1924)
 † Tanea hamiltonensis (Tenison Woods, 1879) 
 Tanea hilaris (G.B.Sowerby III, 1914)
 Tanea hollmanni Poppe, Tagaro & Stahlschmidt, 2015
 † Tanea inexpectata (Finlay, 1924)
 Tanea lineata (Röding, 1798)
 Tanea magnifluctuata (Kuroda, 1961)
 Tanea mozaica (Sowerby, 1833)
 Tanea pavimentum (Récluz, 1844)
 Tanea picta (Récluz, 1844)
 † Tanea pittensis (Marwick, 1928)
 † Tanea praeconsors (Finlay, 1924)
 Tanea sagittata (Menke, 1843)
 Tanea shoichiroi (Kuroda, 1961)
 † Tanea sublata (Marwick, 1924)
 Tanea tabularis (Kuroda, 1961)
 Tanea tenuipicta (Kuroda, 1961)
 Tanea tosaensis (Kuroda, 1961)
 Tanea undulata (Röding, P.F., 1798)
 Tanea zelandica (Quoy and Gaimard, 1832
Species brought into synonymy
 Tanea acinonyx (March-Marchad, 1956) : synonym of Natica acinonyx Marche-Marchad, 1957
 Tanea euzona (Récluz, 1844): synonym of Tanea undulata (Röding, 1798)
 Tanea euzona magnifluctuata (Kuroda, 1961): synonym of Tanea magnifluctuata (Kuroda, 1961)
 Tanea lemniscata (Philippi, 1853 in 1849-53): synonym of Natica marochiensis (Gmelin, 1791)
 Tanea luculenta Iredale, 1929: synonym of Natica luculenta Iredale, 1929
 Tanea pluvialis Kurono, 1999: synonym of Natica pluvialis (Kurono, 1999)
 † Tanea socia (Finlay, 1927): synonym of † Tanea consortis (Finlay, 1924)

Gallery

References 

 Marwick, J. (1931). The Tertiary Mollusca of the Gisborne District. New Zealand Geological Survey Paleontological Bulletin 13:1-177. 18: pls.
 Powell A. W. B. (1979), New Zealand Mollusca, William Collins Publishers Ltd, Auckland, New Zealand 
 Torigoe K. & Inaba A. (2011). Revision on the classification of Recent Naticidae. Bulletin of the Nishinomiya Shell Museum. 7: 133 + 15 pp., 4 pls. 

Naticidae